206th Army Division() was formed in December 1969 from 6th Engineer District of Beijing Military Region.

The division was a part of 69th Army Corps. From 1969 to 1985 the division was composed of:
616th Infantry Regiment;
617th Infantry Regiment;
618th Infantry Regiment;
Artillery Regiment.

The division was disbanded in September 1985.

References

中国人民解放军各步兵师沿革，http://blog.sina.com.cn/s/blog_a3f74a990101cp1q.html

Infantry divisions of the People's Liberation Army
Military units and formations established in 1969
Military units and formations disestablished in 1985